Chahriq may refer to:
 Chehriq, a citadel in West Azerbaijan Province, Iran
 Chahriq-e Olya, a village in West Azerbaijan Province, Iran
 Chahriq-e Sofla, a village in West Azerbaijan Province, Iran
 Chahriq Rural District, an administrative subdivision or West Azerbaijan Province, Iran